Terry Price (born 27 December 1960) is an Australian professional golfer.

Early life
Price was born in Rockhampton, Queensland.

Professional career
Price turned professional in 1978 at age 17, joined the PGA Tour of Australasia in 1986. He won his first tournament in 1988 at the non-Order of Merit Queensland PGA Championship. He has since won five Order of Merit titles on the tour, in addition to several more victories both in Australia and internationally.

Price has also played on the European Tour. He played three seasons in the early 1990s, finishing just inside the top 100 on the Order of Merit in 1994 and 1995, before losing his card at the end of 1996. He returned to the European Tour in 2003 via qualifying school, but had to revisit at the end of the season to regain his card. He achieved a career best finish on the Order of Merit of 53rd in 2004, but he was unable to build on that and after missing much of the 2006 season due to injury, lost his card at the end of 2007.

Price began playing on the European Senior Tour in 2012 and won his first title in September at the Pon Senior Open in Germany.

Price currently lives in Hope Island, Queensland with his wife and three children.

Professional wins (12)

PGA Tour of Australasia wins (5)

Swedish Golf Tour wins (1)

Other wins (5)
1988 Queensland PGA Championship
1989 Papua New Guinea Masters
1990 Queensland PGA Championship
1993 Queensland Open (Foundation Tour)
1995 Queensland Open (Foundation Tour)

European Senior Tour wins (1)

Results in major championships

Note: Price only played in The Open Championship.

CUT = missed the half-way cut
"T" = tied

Team appearances
World Cup (representing Australia): 1999

References

External links

Australian male golfers
PGA Tour of Australasia golfers
European Tour golfers
European Senior Tour golfers
Golfers from Queensland
Sportspeople from Rockhampton
Sportspeople from the Gold Coast, Queensland
1960 births
Living people